Devin Ryan Askew (born July 26, 2002) is an American college basketball player for the California Golden Bears of the Pac-12 Conference. He previously played for the Kentucky Wildcats and the Texas Longhorns.

High school career
Askew attended Mater Dei High School in Santa Ana, California. He entered the starting lineup in his sophomore season. As a junior, Askew averaged 17 points, six assists and five rebounds per game. He was named Orange County Player of the Year by the Orange County Register and Trinity League MVP. Askew scored a career-high 43 points in a win against Rancho Christian School. He led Mater Dei to the CIF Southern Section Open Division title game. He also competed for Team WhyNot, a Amateur Athletic Union program sponsored by Russell Westbrook, and trained with Darren Collison. He was selected to the Jordan Brand Classic roster.

Recruiting
On October 17, 2019, Askew committed to playing college basketball for Kentucky over offers from Louisville, Arizona and Memphis, among others. He was one of the highest-ranked point guards in the 2021 class before reclassifying to the 2020 class following his junior season.

College career
Askew was a starter for most of his freshman season at Kentucky despite struggling. As a freshman, he averaged 6.5 points and 2.9 assists per game, as his team finished with a 9–16 record. After the season, Askew transferred to Texas.

National team career
In 2019, Askew helped the United States win its first gold medal at the FIBA 3x3 Under-18 World Cup in Ulaanbaatar, Mongolia.

Career statistics

College

|-
| style="text-align:left;"| 2020–21
| style="text-align:left;"| Kentucky
| 25 || 20 || 28.9 || .345 || .278 || .806 || 2.6 || 2.9 || .9 || .3 || 6.5
|-
| style="text-align:left;"| 2021–22
| style="text-align:left;"| Texas
| 34 || 3 || 14.9 || .400 || .320 || .545 || .9 || 1.3 || .8 || .1 || 2.1
|- class="sortbottom"
| style="text-align:center;" colspan="2"| Career
| 59 || 23 || 20.8 || .362 || .291 || .738 || 1.6 || 2.0 || .8 || .2 || 4.0

References

External links
Texas Longhorns bio
Kentucky Wildcats bio
USA Basketball bio

2002 births
Living people
American men's basketball players
Basketball players from Los Angeles
Kentucky Wildcats men's basketball players
Point guards
Shooting guards
Texas Longhorns men's basketball players